Yarinda Bunnag (born 6 November 1980) is a Thai architect, singer and actress. She became known in 2001 from the song "Kae Dai Kid Teung", released under GMM Grammy, before leaving to study architecture at Cornell University. After graduating, she joined the indie label Smallroom and released several albums in addition to working as an architect. She has also done acting work, starring in the films Best of Times (2009) and The Red Eagle (2010). In 2016, Yarinda Bunnag was invited to be the regional adviser of Asia Designer Communication Platform.

Filmography

References

Yarinda Bunnag
Yarinda Bunnag
Yarinda Bunnag
1980 births
Living people
Cornell University alumni